Bulia schausi is a moth of the family Erebidae. It is found in north-western Mexico, with strays as far north as Arizona, though it was first found in Tehuacan, Mexico.

References

Moths described in 1936
schausi